Wakefield Corner is an unincorporated community in Westmoreland County, in the U. S. state of Virginia.

Blenheim was listed on the National Register of Historic Places in 1975.

References

GNIS entry

Unincorporated communities in Virginia
Unincorporated communities in Westmoreland County, Virginia